North Dublin (otherwise known as North County Dublin), a division of County Dublin, is a former parliamentary constituency which returned one Member of Parliament (MP) to the House of Commons of the United Kingdom from 1885 until 1922. From 1918 to 1921, it was also used as a constituency for Dáil Éireann. From the dissolution of 1922, the area was not represented in the UK Parliament.

Boundaries
This constituency comprised the northern and western parts of County Dublin.

From 1885 to 1918, it was defined as:

It was bounded by South Meath to the north-west, North Kildare to the south-west, West Wicklow and East Wicklow to the south, the city of Dublin, South Dublin and the sea to the east. It comprised the polling districts of Stepaside, Rathfarnham, Tallaght, Rathcoole, Blanchardstown, Lucan, Kilmainham, Drumcondra, Coolock, Howth, Swords, Naul, Balbriggan, Skerries, Lusk, Rush, Malahide, and Clontarf.

In 1900, the boundaries of the city of Dublin were extended to include areas such as Kilmainham and Clontarf. These areas were transferred to city constituencies in 1918.

From 1918 to 1922, North Dublin was defined as:

History
Prior to the 1885 general election, the county was the undivided two-member Dublin County constituency. Under the Redistribution of Seats Act 1885, the county was divided into two single-member divisions of North Dublin and South Dublin. Under the Redistribution of Seats (Ireland) Act 1918, the parliamentary representation of the administrative county was increased from two to four divisions. South Dublin was extended to the west, with the creation of two new divisions of Pembroke and Rathmines.

At the 1918 general election, Sinn Féin issued an election manifesto in which it called for a "establishment of a constituent assembly comprising persons chosen by Irish constituencies". After the election, Sinn Féin invited all those elected for Irish constistuencies to sit as members of Dáil Éireann, termed Teachta Dála (or TD, known in English as a Deputy). In practice, only those elected for Sinn Féin attended. This included Frank Lawless, elected for North Dublin.

Under the Government of Ireland Act 1920, the area was combined with the Pembroke, Rathmines and South Dublin Divisions to form Dublin County, a 6-seat constituency for the Southern Ireland House of Commons and a two-seat constituency at Westminster. Sinn Féin treated the 1921 election for the Southern Ireland House of Commons as part of the election to the Second Dáil. The six seats were won uncontested by Sinn Féin. Lawless was one of the six TDs for Dublin County.

Under s. 1(4) of the Irish Free State (Agreement) Act 1922, no writ was to be issued "for a constituency in Ireland other than a constituency in Northern Ireland". Therefore, no vote was held in Dublin County at the 1922 United Kingdom general election on 15 November 1922, shortly before the Irish Free State left the United Kingdom on 6 December 1922.

Members of Parliament

Elections

Elections in the 1880s

Elections in the 1890s

Elections in the 1900s

Elections in the 1910s

Notes, citations and sources

Citations

External links
 Dáil Éireann Members Database Office of the Houses of the Oireachtas
 Dublin Historic Maps: Parliamentary & Dail Constituencies 1780–1969 (a work in progress)

Westminster constituencies in County Dublin (historic)
Dáil constituencies in County Dublin (historic)
Constituencies of the Parliament of the United Kingdom established in 1885
Constituencies of the Parliament of the United Kingdom disestablished in 1922